Lawrence Baca (Pawnee tribe) is an attorney and the first Native American to be elected as the President of the Federal Bar Association.

Education 
Baca earned his bachelors art's degree in American Indian Studies from University of California, Santa Barbara in 1973, and received a J.D. from Harvard Law School in 1976.  He has taught courses on American Indian Policy and Law at several universities including American University Washington College of Law, Howard University, and Harvard University Extension School.

Legal career 
He spent a good portion of his career fighting for civil rights among American Indians making sure that many of their voices were heard and reviewed equally just like anyone else. He became the first American Indian Lawyer to be hired in the United States Justice Department in 1976 and when he retired in 2008 he also became the longest serving American Indian Attorney in the history of the Justice Apartment.

Lawrence Baca would also help train other minority attorneys and would also help other American Indians to find ways into becoming lawyers or even attorneys as well

He would also go on to create the Indian Law Section for which he would be the Chairman for 20 years  

Additionally he would also formed the American Indian Lawyers Association of the Department of Justice for which he would be the Chairmen for 30 years He was also awarded the Sarah T. Hughes Civil Rights Award in 2017

Lawrence Baca retired for the Department of Justice after serving for 32 years

Hobbies

Photography 
Lawrence Baca would get his first camera after he graduated from Harvard and would use that camera to take photos of landscapes all across the United States. 

One of the pictures he took were in the State of Utah, sites that had huge red figures or sites that had many holes

Awards and honors 

 In 1988, Lawrence Baca was awarded the Distinguished Alumni Award from the University of California, Santa Barbara.
 For Lawrence Baca's work in advancing American Indian rights Nation Wide he is awarded with The Dr. Carlos Montezuma Honorary Award.
 The Federal Bar Association created the Lawrence R Baca Lifetime Achievement Award for Baca's brilliance in his work in Federal Indian Law, it was created in 2008.
Sources:

References 
:Category:Wikipedia Student Program

University of California, Santa Barbara alumni
Harvard Law School alumni